Pocrí   is a town and corregimiento in Pocrí District, Los Santos Province, Panama with a population of 1,002 as of 2010. It is the seat of Pocrí District. Its population as of 1990 was 906; its population as of 2000 was 877.

References

Corregimientos of Los Santos Province
Populated places in Los Santos Province